The Jamaican flower bat (Phyllonycteris aphylla) is a critically endangered species of bat in the family Phyllostomidae. It is endemic to Jamaica.

Taxonomy and etymology
It was described by American zoologist Gerrit Smith Miller Jr. in 1898. He initially placed it in the genus Reithronycteris, which is now synonymous with Phyllonycteris. The specimen that he described was collected in Jamaica; the date of collection and the exact location are unknown. The type specimen used to describe the species has since been lost. Its species name aphylla was derived from the Ancient Greek word áphullos, meaning "leafless." This is likely in reference to its small nose-leaf.

Description
It weighs . On the dorsal side of the forearm, its skin is pink.
It has a disc-shaped, basic nose-leaf at the end of its snout. Like other members of the Glossophaginae subfamily, it has a long tongue tipped with lingual papillae. Its skull is larger and more robust than most other Glossophagines, though. Fur is silky in texture.
Dorsal fur is blond or light gold, while ventral fur is almost white. Its flight membranes are dark brown or almost black in color.

Biology
It is a social species, living in colonies with other members of its species and other species of bat. Its colonies can number several hundred individuals. It depends on caves for roosting habitat, and cannot exist without them. Little is known about its reproduction, though Goodwin 1970 reported finding a pregnant female in January, per McFarlane 1986. It eats fruit, pollen, nectar, and possibly insects. In 1965, a female individual was held in captivity for one month before dying, living on a diet of banana, papaya, mango, and canned fruit nectar.

Range and habitat
It is only found on Jamaica. It is currently only known to roost in two caves: Marta Tick Cave and Stony Hill Cave. Previously, a "sizeable colony"–the only one known for this species–roosted in St. Clair Cave, although the Jamaican flower bat is no longer found there. Per McFarlane 1986, Goodwin 1970 stated that the bat could be found in three caves: St. Clair Cave, Riverhead Cave, and Mt. Plenty Cave. Goodwin also stated that fossilized remains of the species had been found in Wallingford and Runaway Bay Caves.

Conservation
As of 2015, it is currently evaluated as critically endangered by the IUCN. It meets the criteria for this evaluation because it is only known from two caves, the population size is estimated at fewer than 250 individuals, each subpopulation consists of fewer than 50 individuals, and its population size is likely in decline. The Jamaican flower bat used to occur in five or six caves, but now only occurs in two. Part of its decline in St. Clair Cave may be attributed to the population of feral cats living in the cave and preying on bats. From 2008 to 2015, the IUCN had listed this species as least concern, which is the lowest risk level of extinction. This species is threatened by human disturbance to caves.

References

External links
Image of this species

Phyllonycteris
Bats of the Caribbean
Endemic fauna of Jamaica
Mammals of Jamaica
Bat, Jamaican flower
Mammals described in 1898
Taxa named by Gerrit Smith Miller Jr.
Taxonomy articles created by Polbot